Daisy Lopes Lúcidi Mendes (10 August 1929 – 7 May 2020) was a Brazilian actress, radio broadcaster, and politician.

Life
Beginning her career in radio, her best known on television roles were the Supermanoela, Paraíso Tropical, Babilônia, and Passione telenovela series.

As a politician, Lúcidi served as a Municipal Chamber of Rio de Janeiro city councilwoman and then as a deputy of the state Legislative Assembly of Rio de Janeiro for two consecutive terms.

Death
Daisy Lúcidi died from complications from COVID-19 during the COVID-19 pandemic in Brazil at the Hospital São Lucas in the South Zone neighborhood of Rio de Janeiro on 7 May 2020, at the age of 90. She had been hospitalized in the hospital's intensive care unit for coronavirus treatment since April 25, 2020.

Selected filmography

References

External links
 

1929 births
2020 deaths
Brazilian telenovela actresses
Brazilian television actresses
Brazilian film actresses
Brazilian radio actresses
Brazilian radio personalities
Members of the Legislative Assembly of Rio de Janeiro
Municipal Chamber of Rio de Janeiro councillors
Brazilian women in politics
Actresses from Rio de Janeiro (city)
Rio de Janeiro (state) politicians
Deaths from the COVID-19 pandemic in Rio de Janeiro (state)
Women city councillors in Brazil